General Siphiwe Nyanda  (born 1950) is a former South African military commander and politician. He was a member of Umkhonto We Sizwe and served as Chief of the South African National Defence Force from 1998 to 2005, Minister of Communications from 2009 to 2010 and was appointment as a board member of Denel in May 2018.

Military career
Nyanda joined Umkhonto we Sizwe (MK), the military wing of the African National Congress, in 1974, and served as a guerilla commander during the liberation struggle against the South African government in the 1980s. He was appointed MK Chief of Staff in 1992, and served on the Transitional Executive Council which oversaw the change of government in 1994.

Major General Nyanda became part of the South African National Defence Force, into which MK was incorporated in 1994, and served successively as Chief of Defence Force Staff (1994–1996), General Officer Commanding Gauteng Command (1996–1997), Deputy Chief of the South African National Defence Force (1997–1998), and Chief of the South African National Defence Force (1998–2005).

Awards and decorations
In 1999, Nyanda was awarded the Star of South Africa, Gold.

 
 
 
 
 
 
 
 
 
 
 
  Légion d'honneur (Commander degree – France)
  Commander of the Order of Military Merit (Brazil)
 International Council of Military Sports Order of Merit – Officer

Performance as Communications Minister
Nyanda was a controversial figure throughout the 18 months that he was minister of communications. Dubbed the "minister of comfort" by South Africa's Mail & Guardian, he was residing in a Cape Town hotel throughout his tenure because he was unhappy with the ministerial house allocated to him. 

A company, in which Nyanda's family owned 45%, called GNS Risk Management Services (subsequently renamed Abalozi Security Risk Advisory Services) was accused of impropriety in a tender process in March 2010 due to rogue lawyers. Amongst its numerous clients were several companies, including Transnet CC, passenger train company Metrorail, state bus company Autopax, and the Gauteng Provincial Government.

later emerged that Transnet Freight Rail had been involved in the awarding of tenders without following the correct procedures. Amongst the tenders that were questioned was one security contract valued at ZAR 55 million, awarded to GNS Risk Management Services. Transnet's CEO, Siyabonga Gama, was dismissed when the allegations came to light. However, Nyanda was not reprimanded.

In October 2010, Nyanda came under fire for the suspension of communications director general Mamodupi Mohlala. It was reported that in July 2010, on the day that Nyanda axed Mohlala, she had reported tender irregularities worth ZAR 70 million to the police for a fraud investigation and had reportedly called for disciplinary action against several senior civil servants.

Nyanda fervently denied the allegations calling them "false, spurious and malicious". However, shortly after the story regarding the removal of Moh The Greatlala came out, Nyanda was removed from his position as Minister of Communications. Despite the numerous suggestions of political impropriety, Nyanda was subsequently appointed as a parliamentary counselor to ex-President Jacob Zuma.

References

External links
 No more telecoms '' Fin24

1950 births
Living people
Alumni of the University of London
Members of the National Assembly of South Africa
African National Congress politicians
South African Army generals
UMkhonto we Sizwe personnel
People from Soweto
Communications ministers of South Africa